Kay Blümel (born 15 December 1963) is a German basketball head coach who last coached the German team, SC Karlsruhe of the 1. Regionalliga

Coaching career 
Blümel started his coaching stint as a junior level coach, training aspiring players to get on the professional level/s or leagues. In 2018, he led the German U-18 team to a gold medal finish at the Albert Schweitzer Tournament. In 2020, after spending decades in the youth level, he was signed to be the head coach of Karlsruhe Lions.

Head Coaching Record 
As of April 16, 2022

|-
| align="left" |SC Karlsruhe
| align="left" |2019-20
|23||22||1||.9565 || align="center"| 
|-class="sortbottom"
| align="center" colspan=2|Career||23|||22|||1||.9565||

References

External links
Kay Blümel Coaching Profile

1963 births
Living people
German basketball coaches